Juan Gómez de Mora (1586–1648) was a Spanish architect, active in the 17th century. He was a main figure of Spanish early-Baroque architecture in the city of Madrid.

Gómez de Mora was born and died in Madrid. His father, also , was a Spanish Renaissance court painter to Philip II of Spain and was brother-in-law of the architect Francisco de Mora. Spanish art historian Virginia Tovar Martín has published scholarly works on Gómez de Mora.

Works

In Madrid
 (from 1613)
Project "Near Felipe IV"
City Council building until 1644 
Mayors Hall and Court House 
Jail Project, later became the Palacio Court de Santa Cruz and is currently the Foreign Ministry.
Augustinian Monastery of Santa Isabel, in collaboration with Jerome Lazarus Goiti ( 1639 - 1648 ).
Our Lady of Loreto, in collaboration with Jerome Lazarus Goiti ( 1641 - 1648 ).
Toledo Bridge project 
Choir Reform Monastery of Barefoot Royals 
Reform of the English College, on the site now occupied by the Church of St. Ignatius of Loyola 
Palace of the Councils

Works in Getafe
Cathedral of the Madeleine in Getafe

Works in Alcala de Henares
Patio de Santo Tomas de Villanueva
Monasterio de San Bernardo (The Bernardas)

References 

1586 births
1648 deaths
People from Madrid
17th-century Spanish architects
Spanish Baroque architects